P. commutata may refer to:

 Pachycondyla commutata, a ponerine ant
 Palustriella commutata, a leafy moss
 Phalaris commutata, a true grass
 Platysace commutata, a plant endemic to Australia
 Preissia commutata, a thallose liverwort
 Pteris commutata, a fern in which the frond margin is reflexed over the marginal sori
 Pterostylis commutata, a deciduous orchid
 Puccinia commutata, a plant pathogen